Mount Vernon Mill No. 1 is a historic cotton mill complex located at Baltimore, Maryland, United States. It was constructed between 1873 and 1918 and consists of four buildings situated along Jones Falls.  The complex consists of three closely associated 19th century buildings and a 20th-century warehouse.  There is a large, three-story brick Mill Building (1873); a two-story, brick, "L"-shaped Picker House (1873); a two-story, brick Store House (c. 1881); and a later, reinforced-concrete warehouse (1918).  It served as headquarters for Mount Vernon-Woodberry Mills, one of the world's largest producers of cotton duck.

Mount Vernon Mill No. 1 was listed on the National Register of Historic Places in 2003.

The mill complex, now referred to generally as Mill No. 1, was purchased by Terra Nova Ventures, LLC and began renovations in 2012 to create a mixed-use project of apartments, offices and restaurants. The Mill No. 1 boasts, "The architecture team, Alexander Design Studio has figured out how to make this complicated project work, while keeping the integrity and character of the historic buildings... The structures’ overall historic significance and fabric in their beautiful setting [and] location have been maintained, while adapting the structures to incorporate new uses..." Anyone interested in commercial or residential space in the building may contact Thornhill Properties, Inc. who now manage the building.

References

External links
, including photo from 2002, at Maryland Historical Trust
Explore Baltimore Heritage - Mount Vernon Mill

Buildings and structures in Baltimore
Hampden, Baltimore
Historic American Engineering Record in Baltimore
Agricultural buildings and structures on the National Register of Historic Places in Baltimore
Infrastructure completed in 1918
Cotton mills in the United States